Phi Lambda Alpha, established in 1919 at the University of California, Berkeley was the first Latin American–based Greek Lettered collegiate fraternity in the Western United States.

Phi Lambda Alpha (ΦΛΑ) fraternity established communications with Pi Delta Phi, which had been recently founded in 1916 in the Northeastern United States, at  Massachusetts Institute of Technology (MIT). After some communication, these two organizations realized the existence of a non-Greek letter secret society, the Union Hispano Americana (UHA). As a result of intensive correspondence and various interviews, the three organizations merged. In their merger agreement, the three organizations adopted the name of Phi Lambda Alpha Fraternity, with the distinctive emblem & constitution of Pi Delta Phi, and the goals & motto of the UHA. This new union was formalized on June 11, 1921, in the City of New York.

After  was organized, other societies joined it: the "Club Latino-Americano" founded in 1919 at Colorado School of Mines; the "Federación Latino-Americana" founded in 1926 at Columbia University which joined in 1928; the "Club Hispania" founded in 1929 of Cornell University which joined in 1931; the "Club Hispano-Americano" founded in 1921 of Tri State College in Angola which joined in 1929 and  the Alfa Tenoxtitlan Militant chapter founded in 1929 made up of members of the old ΦΛΑ  in Mexico.

On December 26, 1931, Phi Lambda Alpha Fraternity merged with Sigma Iota fraternity to form Phi Iota Alpha.

Former Chapters

See also
Phi Iota Alpha
Sigma Iota
Phi Sigma Alpha
Union Latino Americana

References

Phi Iota Alpha
Phi Sigma Alpha
Defunct fraternities and sororities
1919 establishments in California
Student organizations established in 1919
Latino fraternities and sororities